Olimpi Stadium is a multi-use stadium in Tbilisi, Georgia.  It is used mostly for football matches and is the home stadium of FC Tbilisi. The stadium is able to hold 3,000 people.

Sports venues in Tbilisi
Football venues in Tbilisi